Mehmet Ali, Memet Ali or Mehmed Ali is a Turkish given name for males. People with the name include:

 Memet Ali Alabora (born 1977), Turkish actor
 Mehmet Ali Ağca (born 1958), Turkish assassin
 Mehmet Ali Aybar (1908–1995), Turkish sprinter
 Mehmet Ali Birand (1941–2013), Turkish journalist
 Mehmet Ali Erbil (born 1957), Turkish comedian
 Mehmet Ali İrtemçelik (born 1950), Turkish politician
 Mehmet Ali Pasha, various people
 Muhammad Ali of Egypt (1769–1849), Albanian-Ottoman governor of Egypt
 Çerkes Mehmed Ali Pasha (died 1625), Ottoman statesman and grand vizier
 Mehmed Ali Pasha (1827–1878), German-born Ottoman soldier and marshal
 Mehmed Emin Âli Pasha (1815–1871), Ottoman statesman and grand vizier
 Mehmet Ali Şahin (born 1950), Turkish politician
 Mehmet Ali Talat (born 1952), Turkish Cypriot politician
 Memet Ali (born 1993), Chinese footballer

See also
 Egyptian frigate Mehemet Ali (launched circa 1860)
 Ali (name)
 Mehmet (name)
 Muhammad Ali (disambiguation)

References

Turkish masculine given names